Saint Bécán (or Began, Beggan, Becain; 5th–6th century) was an Irish monk who founded a monastery at Kilbeggan and is considered by some to be one of the Twelve Apostles of Ireland. His feast day is 5 April.

Monks of Ramsgate account

The monks of St Augustine's Abbey, Ramsgate, wrote in their Book of Saints (1921),

Butler's account

The hagiographer Alban Butler (1710–1773) wrote in his Lives of the Fathers, Martyrs, and Other Principal Saints, under April 5,

Canon O'Hanlon's account

John O'Hanlon (1821–1905) wrote in his Lives of the Irish Saints under Fifth Day of April,

Notes

Citations

Sources

 

 
 

Medieval saints of Leinster
5th-century births
6th-century deaths